The  is a publishing house with headquarters in Chiyoda, Tokyo, Japan. Its product range is centered on foreign language—mainly English—dictionaries and textbooks. The name, Kenkyūsha, can be translated as "study/research company".

History
In 1916 the company's name was changed to its present: Kenkyūsha.

The predecessor of  titled  was launched in 1917.

Kenkyūsha expands, establishing in 1919 a typesetting workshop on the slope of Kudan, a former street in Chiyoda, Tokyo, and — in 1920 — a printing house on Kagurazaka in Ushigome. In 1921, the first volume of the  covering English literature appears. All of the 100 volumes are completed by 1932.

Due to reconstruction, in 1924, the printing house is temporarily moved to Iidamachi. 1927 sees the completion of the printing shop on Kagurazaka. Another press is established in 1939 in Kichijōji, west of central Tokyo. In the same year, the Japanese scholar Fumio Nakajima publishes .
The printing business is split off in 1951 under the Kenkyūsha Printing Corporation.

In 1963 the company publishes  consisting of 12 volumes. A year after its 60th anniversary, in 1968, Kenkyūsha publishes  in five volumes.

The year 1984 saw big changes for the company. Kenkyūsha Printing built a new office in Nobidome, Niiza in Saitama Prefecture. The Fuji plate-making factory and the Kichijōji factory were moved to the new location and at the printing shop at Kudan, a typesetting factory was established.

Dictionaries 
Kenkyūsha has been publishing dictionaries in various sizes for almost one hundred years. The following list is a selection of dictionaries published by the company together with the years of publication.

 : 1927 (1st) by Yoshisaburō Okakura, 1980 (5th), 2002 (6th)
 : 1918 (1st) by Yoshitarō Takenobu, 2003 (5th)
 : 1967 (1st), 1994 (6th), 2003 (7th)
 : 1995 (4th), 2002 (5th)
 : 1984 (1st), 1999 (2nd)
 :
 : 2005 (2nd)
 : 2005 (2nd)
 : 1984 (1st), 1996 (3rd), 2002 (4th), 2007 (5th)
 : 1984 (1st), 1996 (3rd), 2002 (4th), 2008 (5th)
 : 1995
 : 1995
 : 1999 (1st), 2008 (2nd)
 : 1996
 : 1995
 : 1990
 : 1994
 : 1994
 : 1990

Periodicals 
The Rising Generation: with the migration to the web edition, the publication was paused with the March issue 2009
 published from 1945 to 2000, Current English suspended in 2003
  suspended in 1997

Subsidiaries
:

Former subsidiaries
: A printer for Kenkyusha Co., Ltd. In 1951-02-01, it became an independent company.

References

External links 
Kenkyusha Co., Ltd.
Kenkyusha Printing Co.,Ltd

Book publishing companies in Tokyo